GCP Infrastructure Investments (Gravis Capital Partners) is a large British investment trust dedicated to investments in infrastructure. Established in 2010, it is listed on the London Stock Exchange and is a constituent of the FTSE 250 Index. The chairman is Ian Reeves.

References

External links
 Official site

British companies established in 2010
Infrastructure investment
Companies listed on the London Stock Exchange